Jim Minnix is a state representative in the Kansas House of Representatives, representing the 118th district.  Elected in November 2020, he assumed office on January 11, 2021. Minnix is a Republican.

Early life and education
Minnix graduated from Scott Community High School in 1972 and earned a degree at Colby Community College in 1974. He also earned a Bachelor of Science degree in agricultural economics from Kansas State University in 1977, a Bachelor of Science degree in business finance in 1978, and a Master of Business Administration in 1980.

Political career
Minnix served as a Scott County Commissioner for 25 years. In March 2020, he announced his candidacy for State House in the 118th district as a Republican. He won the Republican primary on August 4, 2020 and won the general election on November 3, 2020.

2021-2022 Kansas House of Representatives Committee Assignments
Water
Transportation
Agriculture

Personal life
Minnix is married to Eileen. They have three children and three grandchildren.

References

Living people
Kansas State University alumni
Republican Party members of the Kansas House of Representatives
21st-century American politicians
Year of birth missing (living people)